Compass High School may refer to:

Compass High School (Grandview, Washington)
Compass High School (San Mateo, California)
Compass High School (Tucson, Arizona)